Bager is a Danish surname. Notable people with the surname include:

Erling Bager (born 1946), Swedish politician
Henning Bager (born 1981), Danish motocycle speedway rider
Johann Daniel Bager (1734–1815), German painter
Jonas Bager, Danish footballer
Kenneth Bager (born 1962), Danish musician and record producer
Martin Bager (born 1982), Danish handball player

See also
Louise Bager Due (born 1982), Danish handball player